Bill Dunn may refer to:

Bill Dunn (American politician) (born 1961), American politician and member of the Tennessee House of Representatives
Bill Dunn (Australian politician) (1877–1951), Australian politician and member of the New South Wales Legislative Assembly
Bill Dunn (footballer) (1915–1997), Australian rules footballer
Bill Dunn (rugby league) (born 1967), Australian rugby league player
Bill Newton Dunn (born 1941), British politician
Bill Dunn, protagonist in the short story "The Reign of the Superman"

See also
William Dunn (disambiguation)